Monte Coglians (Friulian: Coliàns) is the highest mountain of the Carnic Alps, on the border between Italy (province of Udine) and Austria (Carinthia), west of the Monte Croce Carnico pass (Plöcken Pass).

Monte Coglians is characterised by karst topography.

References

Related articles
 List of Italian regions by highest point

External links
 Monte Coglians on Hribi.net
 Monte Coglians on Hike.uno
 

Mountains of the Alps
Mountains of Carinthia (state)
Mountains of Friuli-Venezia Giulia
Friuli
Austria–Italy border
International mountains of Europe
Two-thousanders of Austria
Carnic Alps
Two-thousanders of Italy
Highest points of Italian regions